Jean-Charles Cantin (February 17, 1918 – February 5, 2005) was a Canadian politician, who represented the electoral districts of Quebec South from 1962 to 1968, and Louis-Hébert from 1968 to 1972, in the House of Commons of Canada. He was a member of the Liberal Party.

Cantin, a resident of Quebec City, was a lawyer before entering elected politics.

External links
 

1918 births
2005 deaths
Liberal Party of Canada MPs
Members of the House of Commons of Canada from Quebec
Politicians from Quebec City